The election for Resident Commissioner to the United States House of Representatives took place on November 2, 1976, the same day as the larger Puerto Rican general election and the United States elections, 1976.

Candidates for Resident Commissioner
 Jaime Benitez for the Popular Democratic Party
 Baltasar Corrada del Río for the New Progressive Party
 Baltasar Quiñones Elias for the Puerto Rican Independence Party

Election results

See also 
Puerto Rican general election, 1976

References 

1976 Puerto Rico elections
Puerto Rico
1976